Tegernheim is a municipality in the district of Regensburg in Bavaria in Germany. The Danube flows through the cadastrial area of the village.

References

Regensburg (district)
Populated places on the Danube